1958 was the fourth time India participated in Commonwealth Games. India won its first gold medal in these games. India got its first gold medal with Milkha Singh winning the gold in athletics in 440 yards event.

Medalists

Gold medalists

Silver medalists

Athletics
India won its first medal in athletics during these games. The legendary Indian athlete Milkha Singh won gold in the men's 440-yard run. India participated in at least 12 athletics events in these games.

Boxing
India participated in boxing for the first time, in the men's lightweight division (60 kg) and the men's middleweight division (75 kg).

Wrestling
India won gold in wrestling, with Lila Ram winning the men's heavyweight division (100 kg). In the men's welterweight division (74 kg), Lachmi Kant Pandey gave India a silver medal.

References

Nations at the 1958 British Empire and Commonwealth Games
India at the Commonwealth Games
1958 in Indian sport